LDS Hospital (formerly Deseret Hospital) is a general urban hospital and surgical center in Salt Lake City, Utah.  The hospital was originally owned by the Church of Jesus Christ of Latter-day Saints (LDS Church), but is now owned and operated by Intermountain Healthcare (IHC). LDS Hospital is accredited by the Joint Commission. The hospital has 262 inpatient beds.

The current building, in place of the original 1905 hospital, opened in 1984.

See also
 Behavioural sciences
 McKay-Dee Hospital Center
 Primary Children's Medical Center

References

External links

 Intermountain LDS Hospital’s Official Website
 The hospital formerly known as "LDS Hospital" in the magazine: U.S. News & World Report
L.D.S. Hospital Nurses Alumnae newsletter, UA 1020 at L. Tom Perry Special Collections, Brigham Young University
L.D.S. Hospital Newsletters, 1951-1958 at Brigham Young University

 https://intermountainhealthcare.org/locations/lds-hospital/hospital-information/history/

Hospitals in Salt Lake City
Intermountain Health
Hospitals established in 1905
1905 establishments in Utah